Lew Hing (formal married name was Lew Yu-ling; Chinese: 劉興; May 1858–March 7, 1934) was a Chinese-born American industrialist and banker. He was the founding father of Chinatown in San Francisco, as well as Chinatown in Oakland, California and eventually one of the wealthiest Chinese immigrants in America.

After immigrating to the United States from China in 1871, Lew became a pioneer in the canning industry. He owned four canneries in California, in the cities of San Francisco, Oakland, Monterey, and Antioch. His canneries supplied Herbert Hoover’s American Relief program following World War I.  

In the San Francisco Bay Area, Lew also owned a shipping company, two hotels, and an import-export business. In Mexico, he owned a cotton plantation. He was Chairman of the Board of Directors for the China Mail Steamship Company, and President of the Canton Bank of San Francisco. He was also a real estate developer. 

Today, his legacy is being carried on in the Pacific Cannery Lofts in Oakland by Holliday Development, where dedications are made in his honor in one of his original buildings for the Pacific Coast Canning Company.

Early life
Lew Hing was born May 1858 in Canton, China. He was the second of three children born to his father's third wife (after the first two wives died). Lew had an older sister and a younger brother, as well as half brothers and sisters.  His birthplace and ancestral roots were in the village-cluster of Li’ao (裡坳鄉) in Sunning (新寧) (the former name of the district), in the "Four Districts" (四邑) region in the Pearl River Delta Region of the province of Guangdong, China. He received his formal education in Hong Kong.

Before Lew Hing was born, his father had journeyed to San Francisco to find prosperity and he didn’t find it. Rejecting conscription as a laborer, as well as the debauchery of San Francisco's Barbary Coast lifestyle, he camped along the shores of San Francisco Bay until the frustration of disappointment and loneliness caused him to return to China after two months.

In San Francisco 
In 1868 an older half brother of Lew Hing ventured to San Francisco to start a small metal shop on Commercial Street. By 1869, with the success of his half brothers shop and at the suggestion, Lew Hing, immigrated to America. He arrived one year after the Burlingame Treaty, which made immigration between the countries easier. In 1872, his half-brother planned a brief vacation back to Canton to visit his family. His square rigged sailing vessel was off the coast of Japan when it caught fire and sank, causing all aboard to perish at sea. This left the young Lew Hing, at age 13, alone in San Francisco, without family or money.

He attended educational classes a missionary school and learned English, in exchange he worked with translating for shipments from China for U.S. Customs. Hing met P. W. Bellingall, a successful businessman in the importing and exporting field through this experience.

The growing Chinese community that would later become known as San Francisco's Chinatown was beginning to form familial associations that provided leadership and social opportunities among the Chinese immigrants to America. Men with the same surnames would help each other as brothers. This was the beginning of family association in Chinatown, and it was through such association that the young Lew Hing was able to survive. It was with such family association guidance that Lew continued working at his deceased brother's metal shop, while attending a local church mission to learn to read and write English.  In doing so, he also learned to do his own bookkeeping and accounting. Never afraid to work long hours, he also accepted odd jobs for extra money. His industrious and entrepreneurial spirit carried him through these difficult years.

Marriage and children
In 1877, Lew Hing married Chin Shee (July 1860 – July 1947) in San Francisco. They had three sons and four daughters, each born in San Francisco.
Lew Yuet-yung, aka Mrs. Quan Yick-sun (1879–1967)
Lew Gin-gow (1885–1943)
Lew Yuen-hing, aka Mrs. Ho Chou-won (1889–1978)
Lew Wai-hing, aka Mrs. Ng Min-hing (1890–1969)
Thomas Gunn-sing Lew, also known as Tom Lowe (1894–1974)
Lew Soon-hing Rose, aka Rose Lew Moon (1898–1993)
Ralph Ginn Lew (1903–1987)

Early career
Though he was never as skilled in metalwork as his older half-brother had been, he nonetheless learned the basics, such as soldering.  In addition, among his odd jobs he helped a European woman make her fruit jams for storage in glass jars.  This taught Lew about food preservation and how to avoid food poisoning.  It was a natural next step for Lew to combine his metalwork with his food preservation skills to join in the new industry of canning foodstuffs.

At age 18 in 1877, Lew Hing founded his first cannery with another metalworker of Family Association ties, Lew Yu-tung.  The cannery was located at the northeast corner of Sacramento and Stockton Streets in San Francisco and took up the first two stories of the building with the basement as storage.  Lew Hing and other Family Association members lived on the third floor.

In the 1880s–1890s, canning food was still a new concept.  Lew Hing had embarked on a long period of trial and error before the cannery could reliably produce safe and edible canned foods.  When food was not preserved properly or the cans were not fully sterilized (for example, each can had to be soldered individually by hand), noxious bacterial action would ruin the product, causing cans to swell and even explode.  Eventually, Lew Hing developed safer and more effective formulas for canning various fruits and vegetables.  These formulas were never documented since they were Lew Hing's trade secrets and were kept from rival canneries.  Canned fruit items became a very good seller in Chinatown as many Chinese made purchases to take back to China.  Soon, the products were purchased by Westerners and sales expanded outside San Francisco's Chinatown.

Middle years
Lew's original cannery thrived for over two decades. Then, in 1902, at age 44, he decided to close the cannery and retire to Canton. However, within a year Lew returned to the Bay Area, opening the Pacific Coast Canning Company at 12th and Pine Streets in Oakland.

Always on the cutting edge of progress, Lew built his new cannery as the first concrete building in the industrial part of Oakland, plus he insisted on the most advanced machinery for mass production of his products.  Also, in contrast to San Francisco, Oakland had space for a larger cannery as well as providing the Southern Pacific railroad tracks directly to the cannery dock for easy shipping of Lew's Buckskin brand canned goods throughout the United States.  Products included asparagus, cherries, apricots, peaches, pears, and grapes.  Tomatoes were the most popular.  Always a stickler for quality, each morning, Lew would go to the Tasting Room and open, inspect, and taste batches of food processed the day before.  Eventually, Buckskin canned goods would make their way throughout the Western hemisphere.

In 1906, Lew Hing was able to make substantial assistance to Bay Area earthquake victims.  He opened his cannery to the homeless and also provided tents elsewhere for temporary shelter.  He hired cooks to provide meals.  Following the earthquake, many San Franciscans relocated to Oakland, including several Chinese.  As with several ethnic groups, Chinese were compelled to remain in ethnic clusters.  Lew assisted these Chinese with finance and leadership by organizing neighborhoods, including the area that became Oakland's Chinatown.  As a consequence, he became involved with many Oakland Chinatown organizations, making contributions to their many causes and forming business alliances in relation to the Pacific Canning Company.

As the Pacific Canning Company prospered, Lew Hing diversified his interests into many other areas, including a personal interest in the Loong Kong Tien Yee Association, an organization for the families of Lew, Quan, Jung and Chew, and fostered the group in both Oakland and San Francisco.

In 1907 Lew returned to San Francisco for added business interests.  Given his natural leadership in the Chinese community, he became President of the Canton Bank of San Francisco, located at the northeast corner of Montgomery and Sacramento Streets. In the same year he also entered the hotel business, building The Republic Hotel on Grant Avenue (near Sacramento Street). However, his San Francisco interests had to be juggled with his work as president and owner of Pacific Coast Canning Company in Oakland. Always a careful and punctual man, he devised a schedule that allowed him to spend half of each work day in San Francisco, half in Oakland.

Later years 
By 1910, Lew Hing had entered the import-export trade, first as an investor with Sing Chong and Fook Wah Companies which imported art goods from China.  Then, in 1910, Lew Hing began his own import-export business, shipping wholesale Chinese food items from Hop Wo Cheung in Canton, China to Hop Wo Lung, a store on Grant Avenue in San Francisco.

By 1911, Lew Hing's Pacific Coast Canning Company had become one of Oakland's largest businesses, providing over 1,000 jobs during the peak canning seasons.  Employees were usually from the local Portuguese, Italian, and Chinese communities.  Lew Hing was the Bay Area's single largest employer of Chinese.

In 1912 Lew built his second hotel, originally named the Mun Ming Lue Kwan, at 858-870 Clay Street, between Grant and Stockton Streets.  Still in existence, the name has since been changed to The Lew Hing building in honor of Lew.

In 1915, Lew accepted the position of Chairman of the Board of Directors for the China Mail Steamship Co. Ltd., whose office was in the same building as his Canton Bank office.

In 1917, Lew Hing expanded his cannery business by investing in the Bayside Canning Company, a sardine cannery at Monterey's famed Cannery Row.  It was said that the sardines were so plentiful in Monterey Bay that they actually swam their way into the cannery.

By World War I, Pacific Coast Canning Company was regularly exporting convenient canned goods to Europe.  This provided an easy source for Herbert Hoover's food rehabilitation program for Europe.  Lew Hing's efforts were now helping the United States to win the war.

From 1916 to 1921, Lew Hing was the principal owner of a cotton plantation known as Wa Muck in Mexicali, Mexico.  For laborers, he conscripted hundreds of Chinese from China who would pass through San Francisco and go directly to Mexico by rail.  Lew Hing set aside a few city blocks of land on the plantation for shops to accommodate the needs of Chinese workers.  The remains of this impromptu Chinatown still exist in Mexicali.

In 1918, Lew Hing was on a "hate list" for assassination, which made local and international news. 

In 1928, at age 70, Lew Hing established his fourth cannery, the West Coast Canning Company, along the shores of San Pablo Bay in Antioch, California.

Legacy
Lew Hing was a pioneer in California industry. The Lew Hing building remains in San Francisco's Chinatown, and Oakland's Chinatown owes incalculable gratitude to Lew.  The Pacific Coast Canning Company's building had remained, though empty, at 12th and Pine Streets in Oakland.  In 2006 this building was torn down and replaced by housing, Pacific Cannery Lofts, with a plaque commemorating Lew Hing and his importance to the site.

After a rich career in canning, shipping, hotels, banking, and other industries, Lew Hing considered his most worthy contribution to be the swimming pool for the youth at the San Francisco Chinese YMCA, built in 1925.  For more than 80 years, the pool that Lew Hing built was the only swimming pool in San Francisco's Chinatown.

Inventive and industrious throughout his life, Lew Hing was very progressive for his time. He was also a man of high principles.  Coming from his very humble beginning, he had great compassion for Chinese immigrants in America because he understood them well. He was a well-respected gentleman who generated much business in the community and created many job opportunities for the Chinese in the Bay Area. He contributed in upgrading the quality of life for Chinese immigrants in their ordeal of assimilation and integration into the Western ways of life in these United States.

He also related well to the Caucasian community, as indicated when he often attended formal civic events and was included in the inner circle of San Francisco's long-time mayor, Jimmy Rolph. Lew became very American in his ways, never again desiring to return to China.

References

External links 
 Podcast: Long Lost Oakland, chapter 5: Overcoming racism, Lew Hing became king of Oakland’s canning industry, from East Bay Yesterday on Soundcloud

1858 births
1934 deaths
American bankers
American businesspeople in shipping
American hoteliers
American manufacturing businesspeople
American real estate businesspeople
Businesspeople from the San Francisco Bay Area
Chinese emigrants to the United States
American people of Chinese descent